Ismail Yasinov (November 1916 – 9 July 2010) was a Chinese agronomist and politician of Uyghur origin who served as chairman of the Xinjiang Regional Committee of the Chinese People's Political Consultative Conference between 1983 and 1988.

He was a delegateto the 2nd and 3rd National People's Congress and a member of the 5th National Committee of the Chinese People's Political Consultative Conference.

Biography
Ismail Yasinov was born in Manas County, Xinjiang in November 1916, during the Republic of China. His mother died after giving birth to him, and then his father died. Ismail Yasinov and his two elder sisters were raised by his uncle in a township of Artux. In 1925, he attended Islamic Religious School. After graduating from Samarkand Agricultural College in 1941, he worked in the Construction Department of Xinjiang Provincial Government. Soon after, he worked as a technician and then engineer at Liudaowan Nursery Garden in Dihua (now Ürümqi). Ismail Yasinov joined the Communist Revolution in July 1947. He joined the Communist Party of China on 30 December 1949 under the introduction of Wang Zhen and Xu Liqing.

From December 1949 to February 1954, he worked in the Forestry Department of Xinjiang Provincial People's Government. On 1 October 1955, he was admitted to member of the standing committee of the CPC Xinjiang Regional Committee, the region's top authority. He concurrently served as head of Rural Work Department and Forestry Department.

During the Cultural Revolution, he was protected by his colleagues from physical persecution. In 1971, he was sent to the May Seventh Cadre Schools to do farm works. In April 1973, he was assigned to the Cadre Sanatorium of Xinjiang Uygur Autonomous Region. In November of that same year, he was appointed deputy party secretary and president of Xinjiang Bayi Agricultural College (now Xinjiang Agricultural University). 

In February 1978, he became vice chairman of the Xinjiang Regional Committee of the Chinese People's Political Consultative Conference, rising to chairman in 1983. He retired in December 1989.

On 9 July 2010, he died from an illness in Ürümqi, aged 93.

References

1916 births
2010 deaths
People from Manas County
Chinese agronomists
People's Republic of China politicians from Xinjiang
Chinese Communist Party politicians from Xinjiang
Delegates to the 2nd National People's Congress
Delegates to the 3rd National People's Congress
Members of the 5th Chinese People's Political Consultative Conference